opened in Ibusuki, Kagoshima Prefecture, Japan, in 1983. Located in the gardens of a resort hotel and designed by Fumihiko Maki, the Museum's collection includes works by Kuroda Seiki and Fujishima Takeji, as well as Western painters. The adjacent  was established by the bequest of Iwasaki Yoshie, wife of the Museum's founder businessman , and opened in 1998. It houses objects including Satsuma ware and folk art from Papua New Guinea.

See also
 Reimeikan
 Kagoshima City Museum of Art
 List of Cultural Properties of Japan - paintings (Kagoshima)

References

External links

  Iwasaki Art Museum and Craft Gallery
  Guide to the Museums of Kagoshima Prefecture

Museums in Kagoshima Prefecture
Ibusuki, Kagoshima
Art museums and galleries in Japan
Museums established in 1983
1983 establishments in Japan
Fumihiko Maki buildings